Yehuda Cohen (23 January 1914 – 8 August 2009) was an Israeli judge. He was appointed to the Israeli Supreme Court in 1982.

Biography
Yehuda Cohen was born in Safed. He studied mathematics at the American University of Beirut and returned to Mandate Palestine to study law. Cohen enlisted in the British Army and continued to serve as a major in the Israel Defense Forces.

Cohen served in the Jerusalem District Court from 1954, and became its president in 1980. In 1982, he was appointed to the Israeli Supreme Court, where he served until retirement.

Cohen was also active in public life, as chairman of HaMutzar HaYerushalmi organization for promotion of arts (1964–1993), vice president of Israeli chapter of Bnei Brit (1968–1970) and chairman of the board of Ezrat Nashim (later Herzog) hospital (1968–1993). In 1995 he was selected to head a national inquiry commission on the disappearance of children of Yemenite origin during the 1950s.

Cohen died on 8 August 2009, aged 95. He was buried in Rishon LeZion.

See also
Israeli judicial system

References

1914 births
2009 deaths
American University of Beirut alumni
Judges of the Supreme Court of Israel
People from Safed
British Army soldiers
Jews in Mandatory Palestine
Israeli military personnel